Anixia nemoralis is a species of fungus belonging to the Anixia genus. It was documented in 1819 by Swedish mycologist Elias Magnus Fries.

References 

Agaricomycetes
Fungi described in 1819